Claire Andrade-Watkins, is a Cape Verdean–American historian and filmmaker. She is an interdisciplinary scholar of African and African American history with a focus on Cape Verdean American history, as well as Post-colonial French. Meanwhile, she excels in Portuguese-speaking African cinema, cinemas of the Africana diaspora, and Black American film and its filmmakers.

Personal life
She attended Lincoln School Providence, obtained her B.A. degree from Simmons College and later obtained M.A. and Ph.D. from Boston University.

Career
Andrade-Watkins is the founding Director of the 'Fox Point Cape Verdean' Project, a community-based research initiative created in 2007. She also holds the President of production and distribution company, 'SPIA Media Productions, Inc.'. It was founded in 1998 and specialized in media from the African Diaspora.

She is the first academic tenure track professor of color in the college, and the first Full Professor of color in Visual and Media Arts before migrating to the Institute for Liberal Arts & Interdisciplinary Studies. She is also the author of several books including, Society for Visual Anthropology, Research in African Literature, The Independent Film and Video Monthly, American Historical Review, and CinémAction.

Filmography

Awards and honors
She has awarded and honored with several organizations and film festivals.

 Fellowship in Film & Video, 2017 – RISCA (Rhode Island State Council on the Arts), Fellowship in Film & Video, Working the Boats: Masters of the Craft
 Fulbright Research Award 1996 – Republic of Cape Verde, Indigenous Cinema
 American Philosophical Society Research Award 1997 – Republic of Cape Verde, Indigenous Cinema
 Official selection, Hot Docs Canadian International Documentary Festival, Redux category 2020 – Cape Verde Independence
 Official selection, FESTin - Festival de Cinema Itinerante da Língua Portuguesa Lisbon, Portugal 2014 – Cape Verde Independence 
 Black Maria Film Festival, Jury's Choice (first prize) – 2012 Hi, Neighbor (Ola Vizinho)

See also
 Cinema of Cape Verde

References

External links
 

Living people
Cape Verdean emigrants to the United States
Simmons University alumni
Cape Verdean women writers
Year of birth missing (living people)